"Whispering Grass (Don't Tell the Trees)" is a popular song written by Fred Fisher and his daughter Doris Fisher. The song was first recorded by Erskine Hawkins & His Orchestra in 1940. The Ink Spots featuring Bill Kenny also recorded it the same year. A live instrumental version was played and recorded by Johnny Hodges with Duke Ellington and his orchestra in the Cristal Ballroom, Fargo, North Dakota, also in 1940.

"Whispering Grass" was a 1975 UK number-one single by Windsor Davies and Don Estelle.  Davies and Estelle were actors in the sitcom It Ain't Half Hot Mum. It was number one in the UK Singles Chart for three weeks from 7 June 1975. The record is a comic version of The Ink Spots' 1940 recording, and was sung in character. This version of the song also peaked at number 59 in Australia.

The notion of Whispering Grass extends back to Greek mythology, notably the myth of Midas.

Other versions
The song was also recorded by:
 Kay Starr on her 1962 album  I Cry By Night. 
Ringo Starr on his 1970 album Sentimental Journey.
 Sandy Denny on her 1974 album Like an Old Fashioned Waltz.
 The Skatalites, as 'Whispering Dub' on their Herb Dub Collie Dub album first issued in 1976, re-issued in 2001.
Clifford Jordan on his 1985 album The Rotterdam Session
 Heidi Talbot on her 2008 album In Love + Light.
 Kat Edmonson on her 2012 album Way Down Low.

References

External links
 Whispering Grass lyrics, as sung by the Ink Spots in 1940
 Scondhandsongs.com

1975 singles
UK Singles Chart number-one singles
Songs written by Doris Fisher (songwriter)
Songs written by Fred Fisher
1940 songs